Saint-Jammes is a commune in the Pyrénées-Atlantiques department in south-western France. Its name in Béarnais is Sén-Yàmmẹ or Sén-Yàmbẹ.

Geography
The commune is bordered by Higuères-Souye, Gabaston, Maucor,  Bernadets and Morlaàs (to the south).

Localities and hamlets
Blanche-Neige (west)
La Hagède (west)
Serre de Lacrouts (east)
Serre Debat

Economy
An industrial zone is present near the public school. There is a tobacco bar.

Residents
In 2007 the unemployment rate was 6.9% against 10.1% in 1999, with pre-retirees and retirees representing 14.9% of the population (11.1% in 1999) and a rate of activity of 59.1% (58.2 in 1999).

Religious heritage
Saint-Jammes has the distinction of not having a church.

Sports and sports facilities
The 17th stage of the Tour de France 2007 passed through the commune on 26 July. Over the course of 188 kilometers it connected Pau to Castelsarrasin. It has a general sports centre (Aime Capdeboscq). There is also a bowling ground, a floodlit football field as well as tennis court.

Education
The commune has a public elementary school.

Points of interest
Jardin botanique des Pyrénées occidentales

See also
Communes of the Pyrénées-Atlantiques department

References

External links

 Town hall website

Communes of Pyrénées-Atlantiques